Betty Boop and the Little King is a 1936 Fleischer Studio animated short film, starring Betty Boop and featuring Otto Soglow's Little King.

Plot
A special opera performance is held for the Little King and his queen, but the diminutive monarch is soon bored by the music. He sneaks out in search of some new entertainment, and spots a sign for Betty Boop at the local vaudeville theatre. After some difficulties getting a pretzel from a vendor, the curtain comes up on Betty's Wild West show. Betty performs several tricks with her horse, entrancing the monarch. He joins Betty on stage for a song and dance number, just in time to be caught by the angry queen. The monarchs leave in the royal carriage, with Betty (hiding on the fender) holding the Little King's hand.

Production notes
The Little King had appeared in several cartoons produced by Van Beuren Studios (1933–34). In those cartoons, he was silent (as he had been in his comic strip). This short is the only one in which the Little King speaks.

See also
 Betty Boop with Henry, the Funniest Living American

References

External links
 
 Betty Boop and the Little King at the Big Cartoon Database.
 Betty Boop and the Little King on YouTube.

1936 short films
Animated crossover films
Betty Boop cartoons
Animated films based on comics
Films based on American comics
1930s American animated films
American black-and-white films
1936 animated films
Paramount Pictures short films
Fleischer Studios short films
Short films directed by Dave Fleischer
1930s English-language films
American comedy short films
American animated short films
American crossover films
Films about kings